Brocchinia micrantha is a species of plant in the genus Brocchinia. This species is native to Venezuela and Guyana. In Guyana, this plant is commonly found in the Kaieteur National Park. Additionally, this plant serves as a resource and a habitat for a variety of organisms, including the golden rocket frog.

References

micrantha
Flora of Venezuela
Flora of Guyana
Plants described in 1880
Taxa named by John Gilbert Baker
Taxa named by Carl Christian Mez